Estadio Fray Nano is a baseball stadium in Mexico City, Mexico.  It was previously the home field of the Diablos Rojos del México baseball team, which competes in the Mexican League. It holds 5,200 spectators.

The stadium was reopened 2014 as the home of a minor circuit, the Liga Centropolitana. It was expanded later that year in anticipation of the move of Diablos Rojos from their previous home at Foro Sol. Estadio Fray Nano hosted its first Mexican league game in April 2015 as the new home field for the Diablos Rojos.

It is named for pioneering sports columnist Fray Nano.

Baseball venues in Mexico
Sports venues in Mexico City